Bucks Horn Oak is a small village in the East Hampshire district of Hampshire, England and is the main community within Alice Holt Forest. A small eastern part consists of buildings facing its main road and of the main management and tourist sites of the surrounding public forest, postally part of the place. In the Church of England the community and all land as far as Bentley railway station (Hampshire) is in a parish mainly in Surrey, a larger community on the north-east of the forest, Rowledge. In the secular, civil parishes in England, it is in the parish of Binsted, equating to the third tier of local government, namely Binsted Civil Parish Council.

It is well clustered community mostly of low-rise, detached houses immediately west of the north-south A325 road, which is the link between Bordon and the southern A3 (such as Petersfield and Portsmouth) to Farnham.

Setting and housing
The place consists of 114 addresses (some for businesses sharing a building) otherwise houses, mostly with hedges and small gardens and verges of the 20th century  in the Alice Holt Forest, covering about 3% of the forest's area. The balance of houses are 19th and approximately five are 21st century, having replaced mobile homes.

It is the village immediately south of Birdworld, the largest UK avian zoological park and learning centre.

Economy
A few businesses/employers cluster immediately east, near the largest car park of the forest: 
Forestry Commission South East & London
Alice Holt Cycle Centre and cafe
Go Ape, Alice Holt — outdoor adventure business

Its petrol station, tyres, brakes and car wash business featured in 'The Home Made Car', a short BP film used for BBC Colour Trade Transmissions.  A MOT centre and a fencing/gate supplier are small businesses using land fronting the east of the main road, associated with Halfway Farm which consists of one field.

References

Hamlets in Hampshire